The 1941–42 Magyar Kupa (English: Hungarian Cup) was the 19th season of Hungary's annual knock-out cup football competition.

Final

See also
 1941–42 Nemzeti Bajnokság I

References

External links
 Official site 
 soccerway.com

1941–42 in Hungarian football
1941–42 domestic association football cups
1941-42